The 1998 Chapnari massacre was a massacre of 25 Hindu villagers in Chapnari (also called Champanari by some sources) village in Doda district of Jammu & Kashmir on 19 June 1998, by terrorists belonging to Lashkar-e-Taiba and Hizbul Mujahideen.

Background

In 1990, 500,000 to 600,000 Kashmiri Hindus left Kashmir after being selectively targeted by the militants.

The attack

The victims were accompanying two marriage parties when they were attacked. Police sources said that five members were spared. Among those who survived Chapnari were the three primary school teachers and the bride.

Aftermath

Chief minister Farooq Abdullah strongly condemned the attack and described it as "yet another barbaric act of Pakistan-sponsored militants in Jammu and Kashmir". India's Home Minister, Lal Krishna Advani, who had recently assumed overall control of Indian policy in the state, described the killing of the wedding guests as "a clear attempt at ethnic cleansing" and said that responsibility for the attack, and the other massacres of Hindus, rested with Pakistan.

In September 1998, Abid Hussain of Lashkar-e-Taiba, who was the main suspect in the massacre, was killed in an encounter by Indian security forces.  Another suspect, Attullah of Hizbul Mujahideen, was arrested in June 2004.

References

Doda district
Massacres in 1998
1990s in Jammu and Kashmir
Religiously motivated violence in India
Massacres in Jammu and Kashmir
June 1998 events in Asia
Islamic terrorism in India
Islamic terrorist incidents in 1998
Chenab Valley
Massacres of Hindus in Kashmir